Tapalpa is a town and municipality in Jalisco, a state of central-western Mexico.

History 
The word "Tapalpa" comes from the Nahuatl word "tlapalpan" meaning "land of colors."

The region was inhabited by the Otomi prior to the arrival of the Spanish.

In 1523, the Spanish, led by Alonso de Ávalos Saavedra, reached the region. They encountered a native tribe called Atlacco, who did not resist the Spanish colonizers. In 1531, a group of Franciscan friars began evangelizing to the natives.

By 1825, Tapalpa was already registered as a town and in 1869 it was declared a municipality.

The first paper factory in Latin America was opened in Tapalpa in 1840. The factory shut down and was abandoned in 1923 due to the Mexican Revolution. Today its abandoned ruins have become a tourist attraction.

Geography
Tapalpa is located in the southern region of the state of Jalisco. The municipality covers an area of 442.15 km². As of 2015, the total population of the municipality was 19,506 of which 5,566 lived in the town of Tapalpa.

It is located along the Sierra Madre Occidental. It contains approximately 17,735 hectares of forest made up mostly pine, oak, and ash trees. Deer, rabbits and snakes are common in the area.

Tapalpa receives an average of 883.1 millimeters of rain annually, most of it between June and October.

With a height of 105 meters, the Salto del Nogal is the tallest waterfall in the state of Jalisco. It is located 10 km from the city of Tapalpa.

Architecture 
Tapalpa is known for its traditional buildings with white facades and red roofs. Some traditional public fountains where people used to get their daily water are still conserved.

The Temple of San Antonio was built in 1650 by the Franciscans. It is notable for its large vaulted ceiling. A local legend says that a group of bandits once tried to rob the temple but were stopped by a mysterious man dressed in black. It is said that that man was Saint Anthony of Padua, the patron saint of the temple.

Due to damages to the Temple of San Antonio, it became necessary to build another church. The construction of the Church of Nuestra Señora de Guadalupe began in 1950. The construction of the new church was paid for by the contributions of the locals. The church is built almost entirely of red brick.

Government

List of municipal presidents

Tourism 
In 2001, Mexico's Secretariat of Tourism launched the Programa Pueblos Magicos in order to recognize towns across the country notable for their cultural and historical importance. Tapalpa was registered as a Pueblo Magico in 2002.

The area is a popular weekend destination for residents of nearby Guadalajara. Countryside cabins are available to rent for the night. There are many excellent outdoor restaurants that specialize in grilled meats.

Las Piedrotas 
Valle de los Enigmas, also known as las Piedrotas (Spanish "The Big Stones"), is a popular hiking destination in Tapalpa. It is notable for its large natural monoliths. It is located 4 km north of the city. Zip-lining and horseback riding are popular activities.

Notable people 
 Atala Apodaca (1884-1977), teacher, author, and feminist
 Cipriano Campos Alatorre (1906-1934), teacher, novelist  
 Luis Enrique Bracamontes (1923-2003), civil engineer and politician
 Martín Israel Aguilar García (1995-), journalist

References

Municipalities of Jalisco
Pueblos Mágicos